In the 2016–17 season, JS Kabylie competed in the Ligue 1 for the 46th season, as well as the Algerian Cup. It was their 46th consecutive season in the top flight of Algerian football. They also competed in the Confederation Cup.

Non-competitive

Pre-season

Competitions

Overview

Ligue 1

League table

Results summary

Results by round

Matches

Algerian Cup

Confederation Cup

Preliminary round

First round

Play-off round

Squad information

Playing statistics

|-

|-
! colspan=14 style=background:#dcdcdc; text-align:center| Players transferred out during the season

Goalscorers
Includes all competitive matches. The list is sorted alphabetically by surname when total goals are equal.

Squad list
As of 15 January 2017

Transfers

In

Out

References

2016-17
JS Kabylie